"I Walk the Line" is a song written and recorded in 1956 by Johnny Cash. After three attempts with moderate chart ratings, it became Cash's first #1 hit on the Billboard charts, eventually reaching #17 on the US pop charts. 

The song remained on the record charts for over 43 weeks, and sold over two million copies. It has also been used on many LPs released from Sun Records, such as With His Hot and Blue Guitar, Sings the Songs That Made Him Famous, and Sings Hank Williams. It was the title song for a 1970 film starring Gregory Peck and a 2005 biopic of Cash starring Joaquin Phoenix. The song captures Johnny Cash's "boom-chicka-boom" sound by Johnny putting a dollar bill in the neck of his guitar.

Background of the song
The unique chord progression for "I Walk the Line" was inspired by the backwards playback of guitar runs on Cash's tape recorder while he was stationed in Germany as a member of the United States Air Force. Later in a telephone interview, Cash stated, "I wrote the song backstage one night in 1956 in Gladewater, Texas. I was newly married at the time, and I suppose I was laying out my pledge of devotion." After writing the song, Cash had a discussion with fellow performer Carl Perkins, who encouraged him to adopt "I Walk the Line" as the song title. Cash originally intended the song to be a slow ballad, but producer Sam Phillips preferred a faster arrangement; in the end, Cash agreed to the change, and the uptempo recording met with success.

On one occasion, while performing "I Walk the Line" on his TV show, Cash explained to the audience the reason for his humming during the song: "People ask me why I always hum whenever I sing this song. It's to get my pitch." The humming was necessary since the song required Cash to change keys several times while singing it.

The song's lyrics discuss resisting temptation, being accountable, and remaining faithful to Vivian Liberto during his first marriage. However, Johnny Cash would eventually divorce Vivian Liberto and then marry June Carter. Vivian Liberto would write a book called "I Walked the Line" about her time with Johnny.

"I Walk the Line" was originally recorded at Sun Studio on April 2, 1956, and was released on May 1. It spent six weeks at the top spot on the U.S. country Juke Box charts that summer, one week on the C&W Jockey charts and number two on the C&W Best Seller charts. "I Walk the Line" crossed over and reached #19 on the pop music charts.

The song was performed with the help of Marshall Grant and Luther Perkins, two mechanics who were introduced to Cash by his older brother Roy after Cash was discharged from the Air Force. Cash and his wife, Vivian, were living in Memphis, Tennessee, at the time. Cash became the front man for the group and precipitated their introduction to Sam Phillips of Sun Records. In 1955, they began recording under the Sun label.

It was re-recorded four times during Cash's career: in 1964 for the I Walk the Line album, again in 1969 for the At San Quentin album (a live performance), in 1970 for the I Walk the Line soundtrack, and finally in 1988 for the Classic Cash: Hall of Fame Series album. Additional live performances have been released since Cash's death, along with a demo version recorded prior to the formal 1956 recording session that was released on Bootleg Vol. II: From Memphis to Hollywood (Columbia/Legacy) in 2011.

Writing and composition
The song is very simple and like most Cash songs, the lyrics tell more of a story than the music conveys. (You've got a way to keep me on your side/You give me cause for love that I can't hide/For you I know I'd even try to turn the tide).

It is based upon the "boom-chicka-boom" or "freight train" rhythm common in many of Cash's songs.  In the original recording of the song, there is a key change between each of the five verses, and Cash hums the new root note before singing each verse. The final verse, a reprise of the first, is sung a full octave lower than the first verse, the root note lowered from F3 down to F2.

When performing this song in recording, and in later live and television appearances, Cash would place a piece of paper under the strings of his guitar towards the tuning end. As he explained during a 1990s appearance on The Nashville Network, he did this in order to simulate the sound of a snare drum, an instrument to which he did not have access during the original Sun session.

Legacy
The song is included in "The 500 Songs That Shaped Rock and Roll", a permanent exhibit at the Rock and Roll Hall of Fame. In 2004, Rolling Stone magazine ranked the song at  30 on its list of the 500 Greatest Songs of All Time. and also ranked it #1 on its list of the 100 greatest country songs of all time in June 2014.

Covers
Jaye P. Morgan covered the song in 1960, the single charting at No. 66.
Cash's former son-in-law Rodney Crowell adapted the song to a new melody and in 1998 recorded his version as a duet with Cash. This version was titled "I Walk the Line Revisited" and peaked at No. 61 on the country music charts. The song later appeared on Crowell's 2001 album The Houston Kid. (The cover does not utilize the original melody of the song, instead lyrics from the song, sung by Cash to a different melody, are incorporated into a new song by Crowell.)
In 2014, Craig Wayne Boyd covered this song during season 7 of The Voice. The cover reached the Top 15 on the iTunes US Country charts.
Tapio Rautavaara made a Finnish-language version of the song, called "Yölinjalla" (‘On the night line’). The Finnish lyrics tell about the hard life of truck drivers, who often had to drive through the night. The melody was originally credited as Rautavaara's own composition but this was revised in 2008.
Halsey recorded a cover that appeared on the deluxe version of her 2015 album Badlands as well as the trailer for the 2017 film Power Rangers.
Chris Daughtry covered the track in the Top 11 episode of Season 5 of American Idol.

Chart positions

Certifications and sales

Laurent Wolf version

The song was covered by French house music DJ and producer Laurent Wolf and released in August 2009 as Walk the Line Remix.

Track listing

Charts

References

1956 singles
1998 singles
Johnny Cash songs
The Everly Brothers songs
Glen Campbell songs
Rodney Crowell songs
Burl Ives songs
Grammy Hall of Fame Award recipients
Songs written by Johnny Cash
Live (band) songs
Brother Clyde songs
Song recordings produced by Sam Phillips
Sun Records singles
1956 songs